The 2020 Virginia Cavaliers women's soccer team represented University of Virginia during the 2020 NCAA Division I women's soccer season. The Cavaliers were led by head coach Steve Swanson, in his twentieth season. They played home games at Klöckner Stadium. This was the team's 35th season playing organized women's college soccer and their 33rd playing in the Atlantic Coast Conference.

Due to the COVID-19 pandemic, the ACC played a reduced schedule in 2020 and the NCAA Tournament was postponed to 2021.

The Cavaliers finished the fall season 8–3–1, 5–2–1 in ACC play to finish in third place. In the ACC Tournament they defeated Louisville in the Quarterfinals before losing to North Carolina in the Semifinals. The Cavaliers finished the spring season 2–1–1 and received an at-large bid to the NCAA Tournament. As an unseeded team, the Cavaliers defeated SIU Edwardsville in the First Round, BYU in the Second Round, Rice in the Third Round, and TCU in the Quarterfinals before losing to Florida State on penalties in the Semifinals.

Squad

Roster
Updated November 10, 2020

Team management

Source:

Schedule

Source:

|-
!colspan=6 style=""| Fall Regular Season

|-
!colspan=6 style=""| ACC Tournament

|-
!colspan=6 style=""| Spring Exhibition

|-
!colspan=6 style=""| Spring Regular Season

|-
!colspan=6 style=""| NCAA Tournament

2021 NWSL College Draft

Source:

Rankings

Fall 2020

Spring 2021

References

Virginia
2020 in sports in Virginia
Virginia
Virginia Cavaliers women's soccer seasons